Malo-Boriskovo is a rural locality (a selo) in Seletskoye Rural Settlement, Suzdalsky District, Vladimir Oblast, Russia. The population was 12 as of 2010.

Geography 
Malo-Boriskovo is located 11 km northeast of Suzdal (the district's administrative centre) by road. Khlamovo is the nearest rural locality.

References 

Rural localities in Suzdalsky District